Lidija Turčinović (born August 27, 1994) is a Serbian-French women's basketball player. 

In May 2018, she was signed by ASVEL Féminin, where she will play alongside Michelle Plouffe and Alysha Clark.

Honours

Clubs
Basket Lattes Montpellier
 Ligue Féminine (1): 2013-14
 French national Cup (1): 2012-13

National team
France
 FIBA Europe Under-20 Championship for Women (1): 2014 (winner)
 FIBA Europe Under-18 Championship for Women (1): 2012 (winner)
 FIBA Under-19 World Championship for Women (1): 2013 (Runner up)

References

External links
Profile at eurobasket.com

1994 births
Living people
Basketball players from Belgrade
French people of Serbian descent
French women's basketball players
Naturalized citizens of France
Serbian emigrants to France
Serbian expatriate basketball people in France
Serbian women's basketball players
Small forwards